Ancheli railway station is a small railway station on the Western Railway network in the state of Gujarat, India. Ancheli railway station is 12 km away from Navsari railway station. Passenger and MEMU trains halt here.

Trains

 59049/50 Valsad–Viramgam Passenger
 59037/38 Virar–Surat Passenger
 69149/50 Virar–Bharuch MEMU
 69141/42 Sanjan–Surat MEMU
 59439/40 Mumbai Central–Ahmedabad Passenger
 59441/42 Ahmedabad–Mumbai Central Passenger
 69151/52 Valsad–Surat MEMU
 09069 Vapi–Surat Passenger Special
 09070 Surat–Valsad MEMU Special
 59048 Surat–Valsad Shuttle
 69139 Borivali–Surat MEMU

Notes

References

See also
 Navsari district

Railway stations in Navsari district
Mumbai WR railway division